The Arkansas Swing is a 1948 American comedy western film directed by Ray Nazarro and written by Barry Shipman. The film stars Gloria Henry, Stuart Hart, June Vincent, Elinor Donahue, Dorothy Porter and Douglas Fowley. The film was released on July 29, 1948, by Columbia Pictures.

Plot

Cast          
Gloria Henry as Margie MacGregor
Stuart Hart as Bill Nolan
June Vincent as Pamela Trent
Elinor Donahue as Toni MacGregor 
Dorothy Porter as Dorothy Porter
Douglas Fowley as Howard
Syd Saylor as Sheriff Dibble
Eddy Waller as Boggs
Pierre Watkin as Horse Vet
Dick Elliott as Realtor
Ken Trietsch as Hotshot Ken 
Paul Trietsch as Hotshot Hezzie 
Gil Taylor as Hotshot Gil 
Charles Ward as Hotshot Gabe 
Cottonseed Clark as Cottonseed Clark

References

External links
 

1948 films
1940s English-language films
American Western (genre) comedy films
Columbia Pictures films
Films directed by Ray Nazarro
American black-and-white films
1940s American films
1948 comedy films